Ballysodare railway station, currently with only the goods shed remaining, was located on the Dublin-Sligo railway line in Ballysadare, County Sligo.  The station opened on 3 December 1862.  It was closed to passengers on 17 June 1963 and finally closing to goods on 3 November 1975.

The station is believed to have been double tracked since opening, being singled in 1958.

Ballysodare station was on the Midland Great Western Railway which became part of Irish Rail.  From 1882 until 1957 it also was served by the last independent railway in the British Isles, the Sligo, Leitrim and Northern Counties Railway from Enniskillen.  The Burma Road or the Western Rail Corridor line to Claremorris Junction, Tuam and Galway was served from the station as well as Sligo station.

The station had its own small goods shed at the northern end of the west platform.  Just beyond that a long siding diverged south westwards to the Flour Mills at Ballysadare; it was removed in the 1960s.

Notes and references

Notes

References

Transport in County Sligo
Disused railway stations in County Sligo
Railway stations opened in 1862
Railway stations closed in 1963
1862 establishments in Ireland
Railway stations in the Republic of Ireland opened in the 19th century